Rockwood Academy (formerly Park View School) is a mixed secondary school located in Alum Rock, Birmingham. A medium-sized academy that serves the inner city area of Birmingham, it is a popular choice with parents, with many coming from the immediate area with almost all students in walking distance to the academy. The academy is rated as 'Good' by Ofsted in 2016 and the academy was highly commended for its rapid success with high praise coming from the National Schools Commissioner Sir David Carter and Chief Inspector of Schools Sir Michael Wilshaw.

The academy is sponsored by CORE Education Trust. In 2016, the School was in the top 20% nationally for progress made by its pupils between their key stage 2 SATs results at primary school and their key stage 4 GCSE results as measured by Specialist Schools Trust (SSAT). In 2017, the School was in the top 2% highest performing schools in the country.

History
The school was built in the 1960s and was known as Naseby School. In 1983 it became Park View School and was based over two sites. The Lower School was located on Naseby Road and Upper school was based in Park Hall School. The school became Park View Business and Enterprise School in 2005 and later was refurbished in the early 2010s under the Building Schools for the Future programme. The school was previously a specialist Business and Enterprise College; however, in 2013 it became an academy sponsored by Park View Educational Trust.

In 2014 the school was subject to an inquiry: see Operation Trojan Horse. The school was put under investigation by Ofsted.

In 2015, it was announced that the Education Funding Agency had found financial irregularities to the tune of £70,000 including a payment of £27,000 to a public relations firm without authorisation from the EFA. The EFA report alleged that money which had been allocated to the school under the government's pupil premium scheme—which is intended to help the most disadvantaged of children—was misused on public relations.

The school was renamed Rockwood Academy in September 2015, at the request of the children and their families. Rockwood is now sponsored by CORE Education Trust which has lifted the academy from special measures to 'Good' by Ofsted in 2016. The academy has seen rapid progress since then by offering a curriculum that caters to the students needs and also becoming a leader in sports education becoming the first school of tennis with the academy building close links with Ukactive. The academy has also started the first Army cadets scheme that was launched by the Secretary of State for Defence Sir Michael Fallon.

References

External links

 CORE Education Trust

Secondary schools in Birmingham, West Midlands
Academies in Birmingham, West Midlands